Condemnation to the mines ("to the mines") is a way in which the most cruel punishments were applied to those that practiced Christianity. Calistratus called it a proxima morti penalty.  Both Tertullian and Cyprian wrote that damnatio ad metalla was the typical sentence meted to Christians, and deemed it a type of prolonged killing.

In ministerium metallicorum was the phrase in which the condemned were sentenced; these, men and women, old and young, were piled in mines. Before being sent to the mines they were submitted to the cruelest torments; in 257, they were whipped with sticks.

In 307, Silvanus, a priest of Gaza together with his fellow colleagues were burned with a red hot iron the nerves of one of the hamstrings, while others suffered various humiliating torments. Next year the consul Firmilianus of Cesarea, when going through this city saw a chain of miners of porphyry went to the copper ones in Palestine, made them burn the articulations of their left foot and obeying, according to him, an order of the emperor, he made them put out their right eye by punching; later he cauterized their sockets with red hot iron; various Cesarean followers suffered the same torment. A deficient loaf of bread, no clothes and as a bed they had the floor, with the absolute forbidden celebration of the mass.

Examples of exploited mines by Christians, frequently placed with other prisoners are in Israel, whose mines, it seems, were the worst.

References

Sources

Anti-Christian sentiment
Crime and punishment in ancient Rome
Mining
Punishments